"Do U Know Where You're Coming From" is a song by M-Beat featuring Jamiroquai. It was included as a bonus track on the third Jamiroquai album Travelling Without Moving (spelled "Do You Know Where You're Coming From") and released on 20 May 1996 as the album's first single. The song peaked at number 12 on the UK Singles Chart. It later appeared as a B-side to the group's following single, "Virtual Insanity".

Track listing
 UK CD single
 "Do U Know Where You're Coming From" (radio edit – original mix) - 3:41 
 "Do U Know Where You're Coming From" (radio edit – Touch of Horn mix) - 3:38
 "Do U Know Where You're Coming From" (extended mix) - 5:00
 "Do U Know Where You're Coming From" (Full Horns mix) - 4:55
 "Do U Know Where You're Coming From" (Intelligent Groove mix) - 5:17
 "Do U Know Where You're Coming From" (Dextrous remix) - 3:53

Charts

References

1996 songs
1996 singles
M-Beat songs
Jamiroquai songs
Songs written by Jason Kay
Songs written by Toby Smith
S2 Records singles